Ascea is a town and comune in the province of Salerno in the Campania region of southwestern Italy. In the communal territory are the Greek ruins of Velia. It is part of the Cilento traditional area; the maritime touristic part of the municipality is the Marina di Ascea. The town is located on the beach and is popular with European tourists in the summer months.

See also
Cilento
Cilentan Coast
Parmenides
Elea

References

External links

Cities and towns in Campania
Coastal towns in Campania
Localities of Cilento